Anne E. Gelb is a mathematician interested in numerical analysis, partial differential equations and Fourier analysis of images. She is John G. Kemeny Parents Professor of Mathematics at Dartmouth College.

Research interests
Gelb describes her research as "developing highly accurate and efficient data-driven numerical methods for extracting important information in applications such as medical imaging, synthetic aperture radar imaging, climatology, signal processing, and fluid dynamics".

Education and career
Gelb graduated from the University of California, Los Angeles, in 1989, with a bachelor's degree in mathematics. She went to Brown University for her graduate studies, completing a Ph.D. in 1996. Her dissertation, "Topics in Higher Order Methods for Partial Differential Equations", was supervised by David I. Gottlieb.

After postdoctoral research with Herbert Keller at the California Institute of Technology, she joined the department of mathematics and statistics at Arizona State University in 1998. In 2016, she moved from Arizona State to Dartmouth as the John G. Kemeny Parents Professor. She was on the scientific advisory board for the Institute for Computational and Experimental Research in Mathematics (ICERM).

References

External links
Home page

Year of birth missing (living people)
Living people
20th-century American mathematicians
21st-century American mathematicians
American women mathematicians
University of California, Los Angeles alumni
Brown University alumni
Dartmouth College faculty
20th-century women mathematicians
21st-century women mathematicians
20th-century American women
21st-century American women